Donnie Dee (born March 17, 1965) is a former American football tight end. He played for the Indianapolis Colts from 1988 to 1989 and for the Seattle Seahawks in 1989.

References

1965 births
Living people
Players of American football from Kansas City, Missouri
American football tight ends
Tulsa Golden Hurricane football players
Indianapolis Colts players
Seattle Seahawks players